St Andrew's Church is a Free Church of England church in Bentley, Walsall, West Midlands. Three services are held weekly every Sunday at 10am, 11:30am & 6pm.

History 

The church was built between 1884 and 1887, and consists of a chancel, a nave, aisles, an organ chamber, and a turret. The parish was constituted in 1889 and the living was made a vicarage with a gross value of £200.

St Andrew's stands in the Modern Catholic tradition of the Church of England. As it rejects the ordination of women, the parish receives alternative episcopal oversight from the Bishop of Ebbsfleet (currently Jonathan Goodall).

References

External links 
 St Andrew's Church, Walsall

Andrew
Walsall, Andrew, Saint
Churches completed in 1887
Walsall, Andrew, Saint
Buildings and structures in Walsall
Walsall
Walsall